is a railway station on the Gono Line in the town of Fukaura, Aomori Prefecture, Japan, operated by the East Japan Railway Company (JR East).

Lines

Station layout

Fukaura Station has a single ground-level island platform serving two tracks, connected to the station building by a  level crossing. The station has a Midori no Madoguchi staffed ticket office.

Platforms

History
Fukaura Station was opened on December 13, 1934, as a station on the Japanese National Railways (JNR). With the privatization of JNR on April 1, 1987, it came under the operational control of JR East.

Passenger statistics
In fiscal 2016, the station was used by an average of 66 passengers daily (boarding passengers only).

Surrounding area
Fukaura town hall
Fukaura Post Office
Fukaura Port
Fukaura Junior High School

See also
 List of Railway Stations in Japan

References

External links

  

Stations of East Japan Railway Company
Railway stations in Aomori Prefecture
Gonō Line
Fukaura, Aomori
Railway stations in Japan opened in 1934